Superliga florbalu (also Livesport Superliga) is the highest league in the league system of Czech men's floorball and comprises the top 14 Czech floorball teams. The season culminates in a play-off played by the best ten teams. The first season began in 1993–94.

The champion of the league is eligible to compete at the Champions Cup.

Naming and sponsorship 
The name of the league is leased to a general sponsor and changes frequently.
 1993 – 2005: 1. liga
 2005 – 2012: Fortuna liga
 2012 – 2015: AutoCont extraliga
 2015 – 2019: Tipsport Superliga
 2019: Superliga florbalu
 2020 – current: Livesport Superliga

Champions 

List of champions in seasons of the league:

Titles

Teams 
 

Teams in season 2022–23:
 1. SC TEMPISH Vítkovice
 
 
 FAT PIPE Florbal Chodov
 
 
 FBC ČPP Bystroň Group Ostrava
 
 
 
 Předvýběr.CZ Florbal MB
 
 Tatran Střešovice

References

External links 
 Livesport Superliga
 Český florbal – official website

Floorball competitions in the Czech Republic
Sports leagues in the Czech Republic